Uchastok №26 is a rural locality (a settlement) and the administrative center of Shaninskoye Rural Settlement, Talovsky District, Voronezh Oblast, Russia. The population was 216 as of 2010. There are 15 streets.

Geography 
Uchastok №26 is located 21 km northeast of Talovaya (the district's administrative centre) by road. Uchastok #4 is the nearest rural locality.

References 

Rural localities in Talovsky District